Dayalpur is a Gram Panchayat in Gajipur,  Vaishali District, Bihar, India.

Nearest City/Town
Hajipur (distance 10 km)

References

Gram panchayats in Bihar
Villages in Vaishali district
Vaishali district
Hajipur